Statistics of Úrvalsdeild in the 1979 season.

Overview
It was contested by 10 teams, and ÍBV won the championship. Víkingur's Sigurlás Þorleifsson was the top scorer with 10 goals.

League standings

Results
Each team played every opponent once home and away for a total of 18 matches.

References

Úrvalsdeild karla (football) seasons
Iceland
Iceland
1979 in Icelandic football